Ruth Leona Morris (born October 7, 1966) is a sprinter who represents the United States Virgin Islands. She competed in the 200 metres at the 1988 Summer Olympics and the 1992 Summer Olympics.

References

External links
 

1966 births
Living people
Athletes (track and field) at the 1987 Pan American Games
Athletes (track and field) at the 1988 Summer Olympics
Athletes (track and field) at the 1992 Summer Olympics
United States Virgin Islands female sprinters
Olympic track and field athletes of the United States Virgin Islands
Pan American Games competitors for the United States Virgin Islands
Place of birth missing (living people)
Olympic female sprinters
21st-century American women